Maude Sweetman (October 31, 1877 – June 19, 1943) was an American politician who served as a member of the Washington House of Representatives from 1923 to 1931.  She represented Washington's 44th legislative district as a Republican, and was the first woman from King County elected to the legislature.

She was the primary sponsor in 1929 of a bill to enact corporate and individual income taxes, which passed both houses of the legislature and would have gone to the voters had it not been ruled unconstitutional by the Washington Supreme Court.  She served on numerous committees in the legislature, including as chair of the State Charitable Institutions Committee in the 1929 to 1931 term.  She was one of a number of important women legislators who received political assistance from Belle Reeves, a fellow legislator and later Washington's first female Secretary of State.

In 1927, after three terms in the legislature, she published her book What Price Politics: the Inside Story of Washington State Politics.

She was married and had three sons.

References

Further reading
 Article: “Mrs. Sweetman Died June 19 in San Francisco,” The Seattle Times, November 25, 1943
 Book: Sweetman, Maude. What Price Politics: The Inside Story of Washington State Politics. White & Hitchcock Corporation, Seattle, 1927

1877 births
1943 deaths
Republican Party members of the Washington House of Representatives
Women state legislators in Washington (state)